Peter Robert Kolchin (born June 3, 1943) is an American historian. He has specialized in slavery and labor in the American South before and after the Civil War, and in comparisons with Russian serfdom and other forms of labor. He won the Bancroft Prize in American History and the Avery O. Craven Award for his book Unfree Labor: American Slavery and Russian Serfdom (1987).

Life
Born in New York, Peter Kolchin attended local schools. He graduated from Columbia University with an A.B. in 1964, and conducted graduate work at Johns Hopkins University, where he received a Ph.D. in 1970. His doctoral thesis was entitled First Freedom: The Responses of Alabama's Blacks to Emancipation and Reconstruction.

He is a professor at the University of Delaware.

Awards
 1988 Bancroft Prize in American History
 1988 Avery O. Craven Award from the Organization of American Historians
 Charles Sydnor Award, Southern Historical Association

Works
    (Revised Ed. 2008)
 
 American Slavery, 1619-1877 (1993, revised ed. 2003)

References

1943 births
Living people
Columbia College (New York) alumni
Johns Hopkins University alumni
University of Delaware faculty
21st-century American historians
21st-century American male writers
Historians of slavery
Historians from New York (state)
Bancroft Prize winners
American male non-fiction writers